Anthurium bucayanum is a species of plant in the arum family, Araceae. It is endemic to Ecuador. It is an epiphyte which grows in coastal forests. It is threatened by habitat fragmentation.

References

bucayanum
Endangered plants
Endemic flora of Ecuador
Taxonomy articles created by Polbot